The women's long jump field event at the 1960 Olympic Games took place on August 31.

Results
Top 12 jumpers and all ties plus all jumpers  reaching 5.80 metres advanced to the finals. All distances are listed in metres.

Qualifying

Final

Key: OR = Olympic record; NM = no mark

References

M
Long jump at the Olympics
1960 in women's athletics
Women's events at the 1960 Summer Olympics